Thomas Dingsdale (fourth ¼ 1900 – 30 May 1940) was an English professional rugby league footballer who played in the 1920s and 1930s.

Background
Tommy Dingsdale's birth was registered in Prescot, Lancashire, England, he died aged 39 in York County Hospital after being injured in a car crash, and his death was registered York, England.

Playing career

International honours
Tommy Dingsdale won a cap for England while at St. Helens Recs in 1928 against Wales.

County Cup Final appearances
Tommy Dingsdale played  in St. Helens Recs' 17-0 victory over Swinton in the 1923–24 Lancashire County Cup Final during the 1923–24 season at Central Park, Wigan on Saturday 24 November 1923, and played , and scored 2-goals in York' 9-2 victory over Wakefield Trinity in the 1936–37 Yorkshire County Cup Final during the 1936–37 season at Headingley Rugby Stadium, Leeds on Saturday 17 October 1936.

Genealogical Information
Tommy Dingsdale was the older brother of the rugby league footballer; William "Billy" Dingsdale, and the rugby league / who played in the 1920s for Warrington (Heritage № 346); Benjamin "Ben" Dingsdale (born  – death unknown).

References

External links
Search for "Tommy Dingsdale" at britishnewspaperarchive.co.uk
Search for "Thomas Dingsdale" at britishnewspaperarchive.co.uk

1900 births
1940 deaths
England national rugby league team players
English rugby league players
Road incident deaths in England
Rugby league fullbacks
Rugby league players from Prescot
St Helens Recreation RLFC players
York Wasps players